Ayer Rajah Single Member Constituency (SMC) was a single member constituency in Singapore that existed from 1980 to 2006.

History
Ayer Rajah SMC was made up of Pandan Gardens estate, Teban Gardens estate, parts of Jurong East New Town and Clementi West New Town. In 2006, it was absorbed into the West Coast Group Representation Constituency.

Member of Parliament

Elections

Elections in 1980s

Elections in 1990s

Elections in 2000s

References 

Singaporean electoral divisions
Constituencies established in 1980
Constituencies disestablished in 2006
1980 establishments in Singapore
2006 disestablishments in Singapore